Sifu is a beat 'em up video game developed and published by French studio Sloclap. Set in modern-day China, players control the child of a martial arts school's sifu (master) who seeks revenge on those responsible for their father's death. Every time the protagonist dies, they are resurrected by a magical talisman and age up, gaining access to more powerful attacks but reducing their health. When the player character becomes too old, they can die permanently, in which case players must restart the level from the beginning and from the same age as their initial attempt.

The game was released on 8 February 2022 for PlayStation 4, PlayStation 5, and Windows and on 8 November 2022 for the  Nintendo Switch. It is also scheduled to release for Xbox One and Xbox Series X/S in March 2023. It received generally positive reviews, with praise for its combat, environments, and story, and sold more than 1 million units within one month of release.

Gameplay 
Sifu is an action beat 'em up game played from a third-person perspective. The game, which is inspired by Bak Mei kung fu, includes over 150 unique attacks. Basic attack moves can be chained together, though some combos may grant players additional tactical opportunities, such as being able to knock down enemies or stun them. The protagonist and all hostile enemy characters have a "structural gauge". When the gauge is completely filled, the guard of these characters will break and they will become vulnerable to finishing attacks. Players can also block strikes, though this will gradually fill their gauge. Alternatively, players can also evade attacks or parry when an enemy is about to land a blow. A successful parry allows the player to stun the enemy or throw them toward a particular direction. The game allows players to take advantage of the environment and improvise new attacks or alter their strategy when facing a stronger opponent. For instance, the player may kick an enemy off a ledge, or utilize various objects as makeshift weapons. The last enemy in a combat section may sometimes enter a state of uncontrolled frenzy, essentially becoming a miniboss. Occasionally, the player may be presented with dialogue options, which can enable them to potentially avoid combat altogether depending on their choice of words. 

When the player dies in the game, they are magically resurrected at the spot where they die and age several years. As the player character ages, their strikes will be more powerful, but they will have less health. Eventually, it will no longer be possible to revive, and the next death will end the game. Players will encounter shrines, which will be the place where they heal and unlock new skills. They can also visit the "wuguan", a kung fu school, to practice their skills in between levels. Abilities are lost when the player character dies, though it is possible to permanently unlock upgrades so that they are available at the beginning of each run. As the player completes multiple runs, they can access the "detective board", where the information collected across different runs will be stored, and secret areas and shortcuts may open up.

Plot 
On a rainy night, Yang, a disgraced student of a martial arts school in China, leads a raid on his former school along with four other martial artists: Fajar "The Botanist", a ferocious middle-aged man who wields a machete and never talks; Sean "The Fighter", an arrogant young man who wields a bo staff and regards the school's students as weak; Kuroki "The Artist", a young Japanese woman who wields a bladed three-section staff; and Jinfeng "The CEO", an elderly, one-armed woman who wields a rope dart. After defeating the students, Yang confronts the school's sifu (his former master) and strikes him in the chest, causing him to suffer a fatal heart attack. While searching through the sifu's belongings, Yang finds the sifu's only child hiding nearby and orders Fajar to slit their throat. The child later wakes up to find their throat healed, thanks to the power of an ancient talisman in their hand, which can revive the dead but exponentially increases their age with each resurrection. Vowing revenge on Yang and his accomplices, the child spends the next eight years living in isolation, training relentlessly and gathering information about his targets. 

As an adult, the sifu's child, now a skilled martial artist, begins their quest for revenge, tracking down and executing each of Yang's former accomplices after besting them in combat:
 Fajar, who now works for a gang of drug traffickers and possesses supernatural powers in the form of chlorokinesis (plant manipulation).
 Sean, who runs his own martial arts school and an illegal underground fight club and has pyrokinesis.
 Kuroki, who runs an art gallery as a front for organized crime and can create superhuman illusions, including a kunai-wielding dark self.
 Jinfeng, who has become a wealthy but corrupt businesswoman and now wields supernatural bells and a meteor hammer.
Finally, the martial artist goes after Yang himself, confronting him at his private sanctuary. Yang explains that the sifu abandoned him when his loved ones were close to death, which led him to turn against his former master. After a fierce fight, the martial artist strikes Yang in the chest, killing him the same way he did their father. Upon doing so, however, the martial artist sees two graves and learns that Yang tried to steal the talisman to save his dying wife and daughter, but was stopped from doing so by the sifu, who declared that Yang lost his worthiness by dishonoring his oath and expelled him from the school. The talisman then tells the martial artist of the importance of Wude (morality) and sends them back in time, to the beginning of their quest. The martial artist again has to defeat each of the five targets, but this time they have the option to spare their enemies, who in turn show gratefulness and stop fighting them.

The game has two endings, depending on the player's actions:
 If the martial artist kills any of the targets, then they will be again sent back in time by the talisman and be forced to re-enact their fights in an endless loop.
 If the martial artist spares all of the targets, then their fight with Yang continues into the graveyard from the other ending, this time in the real world. After sparing Yang, the martial artist dies from their injuries and is unable to come back to life because Yang took the talisman from them earlier during the fight. However, because they adhered to the principles of Wude, they finally attain enlightenment. A post-credits scene shows the martial artist, now a sifu in their own right, training new students at their father's former school, implying that they were somehow resurrected (possibly by the talisman for mastering Wude).

Development 
The game is developed by Sloclap, who previously released their debut fighting game Absolver in 2017. Unlike Absolver, Sifu does not have multiplayer as the team wanted to focus on developing the gameplay and need not to spend time developing the infrastructure necessary for online games. The game was inspired by kung fu movies starring Jackie Chan, where Chan was shown defeating multiple enemies single-handedly. The term "sifu" refers to "master" in Cantonese, and the combat style featured in the game is based on the Bak Mei style. The team consulted Benjamin Colussi, a Bak Mei kung fu master to ensure that the game was authentic. The game emphasizes "mastery through practice", a key value of kung fu which is reflected through the aging system. The game was also designed to be difficult and features a sharp learning curve, as the team felt that players would not gain a feeling of mastery if the gameplay experience is too easy.

Sloclap officially announced the game in February 2021 during Sony's State of Play livestream. The team initially planned to release the game in 2021, but it was delayed to the following year to further polish the game and avoid overworking the team. Sifu was released on 8 February 2022 for Windows via the Epic Games Store, PlayStation 4 and PlayStation 5, with players who purchase the Deluxe Edition having access the game 48 hours earlier, and receive a digital art book and the original soundtrack composed by Howie Lee. A retail edition of the game, titled Sifu: Vengeance Edition, was released by publisher Microids on May 3, 2022.

Sloclap announced a series of content updates in April 2022, the first being new outfits, an advanced training mode and difficulty options such as an easy mode called "Student" where enemies are more forgiving and the ageing mechanic is significantly downplayed, and a hard mode, referred to ingame as "Master", giving players a challenge far more punishing than the original difficulty setting, which still remains in the game as "Disciple". A bonus outfit for owners of the Deluxe Edition called "Young Man"–made as a homage to the 2003 South Korean neo-noir action film Oldboy–was also released.

On August 31, 2022, Sloclap released a free update which added new outfits and a new scoring system. It also introduced gameplay modifiers such as infinite health and unbreakable weapons.

Reception

Critical reception 

Sifu received "generally favorable" reviews for most platforms according to review aggregator Metacritic; the PlayStation 4 version received "mixed or average" reviews.

IGN called the game "utterly uncompromising in its design", praising the narrative, combat, controller haptics, environments, AI, structure, and expressed minor issues with the camera. Destructoid called it "a constant uphill battle" and "intensely rewarding", concluding, "Sifu is a challenge worth taking on and overcoming. It’s a story of vengeance with a little heart at the end, and though it might not land perfectly, it’s got a lot of style and action to back it up." Game Informers review was slightly less positive about the game's structure, praising its combat for coming out of the gate strong while stating that the game eventually became a tiresome grind. GameSpot heavily lauded the game's two modes of combat, stating that they were impactful, and also praised the inventive aging mechanic and lack of a repetitive feel due to dynamic fights. The bad camera, bland story and characters, and superfluous investigative elements received some criticism. GamesRadar+ wrote positively about the game, praising its learning curve, aesthetics, and replayability, while taking some issue with the short length and limited enemy variety. Push Square gave the game eight stars out of ten, similarly praising its combat, rewarding feel, presentation, art direction, level design, and soundtrack, while criticizing the occasional unfairness in trial-and-error gameplay and its wonky camera.

Blake Morse from Shacknews gave the game a negative review. He criticised the game's upgrade system and its roguelike structure, which forces players to grind for a extended period of time and replay levels frequently in order to progress.

Sales 
Sifu sold over 500,000 copies within 48 hours of its release. The game sold over 1 million copies by March 2022.

Accolades

Film adaptation
In December 2022, Story Kitchen announced a partnership with Sloclap to make a live-action feature film adaptation of Sifu. Derek Kolstad will adapt the game into a screenplay.

References

External links 
 

2022 video games
3D beat 'em ups
Beat 'em ups
Action video games
Ageing in fiction
Indie video games
Martial arts video games
Nintendo Switch games
PlayStation 4 games
PlayStation 5 games
Roguelike video games
Single-player video games
Unreal Engine games
Video games about old age
Video games about revenge
Video games developed in France
Video games featuring protagonists of selectable gender
Video games set in China
Windows games
Xbox One games
Xbox Series X and Series S games